Foreign Affairs is the fifth studio album by singer and songwriter Tom Waits, released on September 13, 1977 on Asylum Records. It was produced by Bones Howe, and featured Bette Midler singing a duet with Waits on "I Never Talk to Strangers".

Production
Bones Howe, the album's producer and engineer, remembers the album's original concept and production approach thus:

"[Waits] talked to me about doing this other material [...] He said, 'I'm going to do the demos first, and then I'm gonna let you listen to them. Then we should talk about what it should be.' I listened to the material and said, 'It's like a black-and-white movie.' That's where the cover came from. The whole idea that it was going to be a black-and-white movie. It's the way it seemed to me when we were putting it together. Whether or not it came out that way, I don't have any idea, because there's such metamorphosis when you're working on [records]. They change and change."

Artwork
Pictured on the cover with Waits is a Native American woman named Marsheila Cockrell, who worked at the box office of The Troubadour in Los Angeles. "She was a girl who was... not a girlfriend but she thought she was a girlfriend."

"For the album cover Waits wanted to convey the film-noir mood that coloured so many of the songs.  Veteran Hollywood portraitist George Hurrell was hired to shoot Waits, both alone and in a clutch with a shadowy female whose ring-encrusted right hand clamped a passport to his chest. The back-cover shot of Tom was particularly good, casting him as a slicked-back hoodlum—half matinee idol, half hair-trigger psychopath. The inner sleeve depicted the soused singer clawing at the keys of his Tropicana upright."

Critical reception

Village Voice critic Robert Christgau gave a mixed review of Foreign Affairs. He appreciated the Bette Midler duet "I Never Talk to Strangers", "Jack & Neal"'s combination of poetry and jazz, the "mumbled monologue" of "Barber Shop", and the title track, which he described as "Anglophile", but lamented "Potter's Field" for its theatrical music and narrative following "a high-rolling nightstick". He critiqued the album further in Christgau's Record Guide: Rock Albums of the Seventies (1981):

Track listing
All tracks written by Tom Waits, except where noted.

Side one

Side two

Personnel
Tom Waits - vocals, piano
 Gene Cipriano – clarinet solos on "Potter's Field"
 Jim Hughart – bass
 Shelly Manne – drums
 Bette Midler – vocals on "I Never Talk to Strangers"
 Jack Sheldon – trumpet solos
 Frank Vicari – tenor saxophone solos

Notes

Tom Waits albums
1977 albums
Asylum Records albums
Albums produced by Bones Howe